San Sisto College is a Roman Catholic secondary college for girls in Years 7–12, located in Carina, a suburb located in South-East Brisbane, Queensland, Australia. It is in the Dominican tradition and caters for approximately 700 girls.

The school is affiliated with the Dominican Sisters of Eastern Australia and the Solomon Islands.

Houses
San Sisto College has a house system to facilitate school based competitions and activities. The school currently has four houses, named after influential women within the Institute of the Blessed Virgin Mary:

 Catherine House is named after Catherine of Siena.
 Jude House is named after the college's first principal, Jude Loneragan.
 Dominic House is named after Saint Dominic.
 Rose House is named after Saint Rose of Lima.

There are a number of important inter-house events during the year, including athletics and swimming carnivals, and competitions in the performing arts.

Schools 

The college is divided into three schools: Caleruega (Years 7 and 8), Fanjeaux (Years 9 and 10) and Bologna (Years 11 and 12).

Co-curricular sport 

The sport and HPE programs enables students to learn skills, develop confidence and fitness and to understand the values of belonging to a team. The programs in Years 7-10 endeavour to develop the student awareness of creating a healthy lifestyle and promoting effective use of leisure time.

Structure

A wide variety of sports is offered to cater for all student needs and interests. The program includes many traditional sports such as: swimming, basketball, volleyball, netball, hockey, Futsal, soccer, touch football, athletics, gymnastics etc. The subject Health and Physical Education is offered as a subject in Years 7 and 8 and an elective subject in Years 9 and above.

Activities include:

• Athletics (Track & Field)

• AFL

• Basketball

• Indoor Cricket

• Cross Country

• Hockey

• Netball

• Soccer

• Swimming

• Tennis

• Touch

• Volleyball

• Sport Aerobics

Representative Sport:

• Lytton District

• Composite District

• Metropolitan East.

These are generally played as part of the Catholic Secondary Schoolgirls' Sports Association (CaSSSA ) competitions.

Co-curricular music 

San Sisto College offers students the opportunity to participate in an exciting variety of optional programs and co-curricular activities relating to music.

Participation in music experiences can provide a number of benefits to the individual. Individual tuition in music can assist in the development of confidence and self-esteem, in addition to the development of specific skills and techniques pertaining to the Performing Art studied. Students also gain a unique way of understanding the world, at the same time, developing valuable ways of self-expression and communication.

Service 

Service activities e.g. Rosies, St Brendan's Homework Club, Salvin Park, B4C Sustainability Centre, GALS and Trading Circle

• Support of refugee families

• Monetary support for the Kopanang Community Trust

• Immersion trips e.g. Cambodia and Vietnam

• Support of fundraising for groups such as Caritas, Catholic Mission, St Vincent de Paul, and Dominican communities

• Social action through support of groups such as Social Justice Group and Greenies and their various projects, inter-school justice activities.

References

External links
 San Sisto College Website

Catholic secondary schools in Brisbane